Gingicithara is a genus of sea snails, marine gastropod mollusks in the family Mangeliidae,

Species
Species within the genus Gingicithara include:
 Gingicithara cylindrica (Reeve, 1846)
 Gingicithara lyrica (Reeve, 1846)
 Gingicithara maraisi Kilburn, 1992
 Gingicithara notabilis (E. A. Smith, 1888)
 Gingicithara pessulata (Reeve, 1846)
 Gingicithara ponderosa (Reeve, 1846)

References

  Tucker, J.K. 2004 Catalog of recent and fossil turrids (Mollusca: Gastropoda). Zootaxa 682:1-1295.
 Kilburn R.N. 1992. Turridae (Mollusca: Gastropoda) of southern Africa and Mozambique. Part 6. Subfamily Mangeliinae, section 1. Annals of the Natal Museum, 33: 461–575

External links
   Bouchet P., Kantor Yu.I., Sysoev A. & Puillandre N. (2011) A new operational classification of the Conoidea. Journal of Molluscan Studies 77: 273-308
 Worldwide Mollusc Species Data Base: Mangeliidae
  Global Names Index : Gingicithara 

 
Gastropod genera